was a decision of the Court of Appeal for Ontario concerning aboriginal title in Canada.

Background
The Chippewas of Sarnia, a First Nation band, claimed aboriginal title to a parcel of land comprising  on the St. Clair River downstream from Sarnia, Ontario. It had been sold by the band to Malcolm Cameron, a Canadian politician and land speculator, such transaction being ratified through letters patent issued in 1853. In 1995, after discovering in 1979 that there was no documentation pertaining to a formal surrender of the lands to the Crown, the band initiated proceedings for a declaration stating that they had never surrendered their interest in the lands.

First certified as a class proceeding by Adams J in 1996, Campbell J, a motions judge of the Ontario Superior Court of Justice, ordered in April 1999 that:

Canada's motion to dismiss the Chippewas' claim on the basis that the Cameron patent was valid was dismissed.
The landowners' motion in respect of the validity of the 1853 Cameron patent was also dismissed.
The Chippewas' motion in respect of the invalidity of the Cameron patent was allowed. A declaration was issued to the effect that the patent issued to Malcolm Cameron on August 13, 1853 was void ab initio and of no force and effect because there was no lawful surrender. Neither the orders-in-council of March 19, 1840 and June 18, 1840, which approved the sale to Cameron, nor the subsequent letters patent, extinguished the Chippewas' unceded, unsurrendered, common law and aboriginal interests in the lands.
The Chippewas' motion for a declaration that they enjoyed continuing and unextinguished common law, aboriginal, treaty and constitutional rights in the lands was dismissed.
The Chippewas' action for damages against the Crown was permitted to continue.
The motion by the landowners was allowed. The Chippewas' claim against the landowners was dismissed on the basis that the defence of good faith purchaser for value without notice protected the landowners' title and that the application of an equitable limitation period of 60 years worked to extinguish all right, title and interest of the Chippewas in the disputed lands as of August 26, 1921. A declaration was issued to the effect that the present landowners held their title free and clear from any aboriginal title claims.

A series of six appeals and cross-appeals were subsequently filed with the Ontario Court of Appeal.

Judgment on appeal
In a per curiam judgment, the Court allowed the appeals and cross-appeals by Canada, Ontario and the landowners and dismissed the appeal by the Chippewas. Consequently, paragraphs 1, 2, 5 and 6 of the motions judge's order were set aside, and the following was substituted:

The landowners' motion for summary judgment dismissing the Chippewas' claim in respect of the invalidity of the Cameron patent is allowed.
The Chippewas' motion for summary judgment in respect of the invalidity of the Cameron patent is dismissed.

The Court noted that "In the Canadian legal tradition, no right is absolute, not even constitutionally protected Aboriginal rights", and "In the case of a claim to aboriginal title, a court must approach the issue of delay with extreme caution and with due regard to the nature of the right at issue." Aboriginal title has been held to be sui generis in nature, and "the Chippewas cannot escape the fact that, from a private law perspective, they are claiming remedies that are discretionary in nature and subject to equitable defences." Proceeding "on the basis that the Chippewas have a right of action against the Crown for damages", the Court summarized the public and private law remedies with respect to the lands in question:

 In the case of a claim to aboriginal title, a court must approach the issue of delay with extreme caution and with due regard to the nature of the right at issue.
 Public law remedies available for attacking the validity of the Crown patent are subject to two discretionary factors: (a) the nature of the disputed act, the nature of the illegality committed and its consequences; and (b) the nature of the delay and its consequences for third parties.
 A claim to aboriginal title is not immune from the overriding principles of equity, particularly where equitable remedies are being claimed.
 The nemo dat principle does not automatically invalidate Crown patents. Established legal principles require that the interests of innocent third parties must be considered.
 Because of the equitable doctrine of laches, the 150-year delay in pursuing their claim was fatal to enforcing any judgment against the private landowners.
 Equity provides protection to a good faith purchaser who acquires a thing for value.

Seeking leave of appeal to the Supreme Court of Canada
An application for leave to appeal was denied in November 2001. An application for reconsideration, following the publication of two critical law review articles, was dismissed with costs in June 2002.

Impact and aftermath
Chippewas of Sarnia, together with Delgamuukw, are considered to form the legal framework for determining aboriginal title in those parts of Canada with unceded territory that has never been formally surrendered to the Crown (most prominently in British Columbia). Its approach with respect to dealing with the rights of private landowners involved was subsequently affirmed by the Supreme Court in R v Marshall.

Observers agreed that this case represented the first application of equity to land claims, but noted that the results were mixed.

Further reading

Notes and references

Notes

References

2000 in Canadian case law
First Nations governments in Ontario
Class action case law in Canada
Aboriginal title case law in Canada
2000 in Ontario
Court of Appeal for Ontario cases
Canadian federal government litigation